The University of Angers is a public university in western France, with campuses in Angers, Cholet, and Saumur.

It forms part of the Angers-Le Mans University Community.

History
The University of Angers was initially established during the 11th century as the School of Angers. It became known as the University of Angers in 1337 and was the fifth largest university in France at the time. The university existed until 1793 when all universities in France were closed. Nearly 2 centuries later, the university was reestablished in 1971 after a regrouping of several preexisting higher education establishments. It would go on to add additional campuses in Cholet and Saumur in 1987 and 2004, respectively. Today, the University of Angers counts more than 25,000 students across all campuses.

The University was rated the best university in France in 2015 for success rates.

Academics
The University of Angers offers bachelors, vocational bachelors, masters, and doctoral degrees across its 8 faculties and institutes:
Faculty of Tourism and Culture (ESTHUA)
Faculty of Health
Faculty of Languages, Humanities and Social Sciences
Faculty of Law and Economics
Faculty of Sciences
Institute of Business Administration (IAE)
Institute of Technology (IUT)
Polytech Angers (Engineering school)

The university also offers non-degree options, including DAEU diplomas.

Campuses
The University of Angers is situated on 3 campuses in various parts of Angers (Belle-Beille, Santé, and Saint-Serge), as well as campuses in Cholet and Saumur. There are 2 university libraries, available on the Saint-Serge and Belle-Beille campuses. Near the Santé campus, the university maintains a botanical garden, which as of 2022, is open year-round.
The university also offers several CROUS student residence and dining halls in Angers.

Memorial
In 2015, the Maison des Sciences Humaines at the university was named after Germaine Tillion (1907-2008), an ethologist and member of the French Resistance.

Notable faculty

Ancient
 Nicolas d'Orbellis (c.1400-1475) - Franciscan theologian and philosopher, of the Scotist school
 William Gordon (c. 1499-1577) - last of the pre-Reformation bishops of Aberdeen owing allegiance to the Roman Catholic Church
 John Baber (1625 – 1704) - English physician to Charles II, 
 Pierre Fauchard (1679-1761) - physician, credited as being the father of modern dentistry
 Étienne-Alexandre Bernier (1762-1806) - theologian and Royalist politician

Modern
 Jörg Guido Hülsmann (born 1966) - monetary economist
 Jean Laroche (1921, in Nantes–2010) - poet 
 Pierre Michel (born 1942) - professor of literature 
 David Trotman (born 1951) - mathematician

Notable alumni

Ancient
 William de Lauder (c. 1380 – 1425) - bishop of Glasgow and Lord Chancellor of Scotland.
 Robert Morison (1620-1683) - Scottish botanist and taxonomist
 Johan de Witt (1625-1672) - Dutch statesman
 Regnier de Graaf (1641-1673) - Dutch physician, physiologist and anatomist 
 Robert Sibbald (1641-1722) - Scottish physician and antiquary
 Denis Papin (1647-1713) - physicist, mathematician and inventor
 Georges-Louis Leclerc, Comte de Buffon (1707-1788) - naturalist, mathematician, cosmologist, and encyclopédiste

Modern
 Roselyne Bachelot (born 1946) - politician
 Jiro Ono (小野 次郎) (born 1953) - Japanese politician 
 Denis Mukwege (born 1955) - Congolese gynecologist and Pentecostal pastor; jointly awarded the Nobel Peace Prize 2018

See also 
 List of medieval universities

References

External links 

 
Universities and colleges in Angers
Educational institutions established in 1971
1356 establishments in Europe
1350s establishments in France
1793 disestablishments
Public universities in France
Universities in Pays de la Loire